Bani 'Amir is an Arab tribe in Morocco, descended from Banu Hilal. It mainly inhabits the Hilali city Fquih Ben Salah and the surrounding areas in the Tadla tribal confederation. Bani 'Amir settled in Morocco in the 12th century during the reign of Almohad caliph Abd al-Mu'min.

See also 
Morocco
Tadla
Beni Hassan
Maqil
Beni Ahsen

References 

Arab tribes in Morocco